Rexhep Jella was an Albanian politician and mayor of Tirana from 1930 through 1933.

References

Year of birth missing
Year of death missing
Mayors of Tirana
Congress of Durrës delegates